Temple Sinai is an historic Reform synagogue located at 11 Church Street on the corner of West Hampton Avenue, in Sumter, South Carolina, United States.  Built in 1912 of brick in the Moorish Revival style, Temple Sinai was added to the National Register of Historic Places on January 21, 1999. It is also known as Congregation Sinai, whose official name is the Sumter Society of Israelites.  It also houses the Temple Sinai Jewish History Center which opened in June 2018.

History
The first Jewish settlers in Sumter were Sephardi who came from Charleston in 1815. Congregation Sinai, whose official name is the Sumter Society of Israelites, was formed in April, 1895, by the merger of the Hebrew Cemetery Society and the Sumter Hebrew Benevolent Society. Visiting rabbis from Charleston and Augusta, Georgia. served the congregation until 1904 when Rabbi Jacob Klein settled in Sumter. The sanctuary of the  present temple was built in 1912 facing Church Street to replace an earlier wooden synagogue on the site.

The Barnett Memorial Addition, a two-story brick Moorish Revival auditorium/banquest hall and classroom/office building facing West Hampton Avenue, was built in 1932, behind the sanctuary, which it complements. In 1956, the one story brick Hyman Brody Building was attached to the rear of the Barnett Memorial Addition to provide a kitchen and more classrooms, offices and restrooms. Although simpler than the other two buildings, it still has some Moorish features.

Temple Sinai's archives have been donated to the Jewish Heritage Collection at the College of Charleston.

Stained glass windows
Temple Sinai is noted for the eleven drapery glass stained glass windows on its side and entrance walls, which depict scenes from the Tanakh. With the exception of one round window high over the entrance portico, the windows are uniformly five feet wide by twenty feet high and in their shape mimic the castellated domed Moorish towers that flank the entrance.

Current status
Temple Sinai is still an active reform congregation. It has entered into an agreement with Coastal Community Foundation, Kahal Kadosh Beth Elohim Synagogue, and the Charleston Jewish Federation to maintain its cemetery and Temple and to address concerns regarding its long-term viability. Additionally, in 2015, Temple Sinai entered a partnership with the Sumter County Museum to create a permanent exhibit about Jewish history in South Carolina and in Sumter.  The museum also includes a section devoted to the Holocaust and Sumter's ties to the Holocaust.  Temple Sinai Jewish History Center opened to the public on June 2, 2018.

See also
 List of Registered Historic Places in South Carolina

References

External links
 Historical Society of South Carolina: Jewish Heritage Days, Sumter, SC, March 2006
 Jewish Historical Society of South Carolina: History of Temple Sinai
 Jewish Historical Society of South Carolina: Directory of South Carolina Synagogues
 Jewish Historical Society of South Carolina: Temple Sinai Cemetery Listings
 Kenneth Schmidt, Transcription of Sumter Jewish Cemetery, 2005
 Goldring/Woldenberg Institute of Southern Jewish Life (ISJL): History of Temple Sinai, accessed 11-30-2010

Synagogues on the National Register of Historic Places in South Carolina
Synagogues in South Carolina
Moorish Revival synagogues
Religious organizations established in 1895
Synagogues completed in 1912
Buildings and structures in Sumter County, South Carolina
Reform synagogues in South Carolina
Moorish Revival architecture in South Carolina
National Register of Historic Places in Sumter County, South Carolina
1895 establishments in South Carolina
Sephardi Jewish culture in South Carolina
Sephardi Reform Judaism